The Men's Junior AHF Cup is a men's international under-21 field hockey competition in Asia organized by the Asian Hockey Federation. The tournament was founded in 2003 and serves as the qualification tournament for the next Men's Hockey Junior Asia Cup.

Four different teams have won the tournament and the 2019 edition was held in Muscat, Oman.

Results

Summary

* = hosts

Team appearances

See also
 Men's AHF Cup
 Men's Hockey Junior Asia Cup
 Women's Junior AHF Cup

References

External links
Asian Hockey Federation
todor66.com archive

 
Junior AHF Cup
Asian youth sports competitions
Junior AHF Cup
AHF Cup